Lauri Sild (born 28 May 1990) is an Estonian orienteer.

He was born in Valga. His parents are orienteers Sixten Sild of Estonia and Sarmite Sild of Latvia, and his older brother is orienteer Timo Sild. In 2014 he graduated from the University of Tartu's Institute of Physical Education.

He started his orienteer exercising in 1997, coached by his mother. Since 2009 his coach is Tiit Tali. 2011-2021 he has competed in World Orienteering Championships; best place is 4th in relay (2017).

He is 20-times Estonian champion.

In 2013 he was named as Best Man Orienteer of Estonia.

References

External links
 

Living people
1990 births
Estonian orienteers
University of Tartu alumni
Estonian people of Latvian descent
Sportspeople from Valga, Estonia